Tapfheim is a municipality in the district of Donau-Ries in Bavaria in Germany. It lies on the river Danube.

Mayors
since 2004: Karl Malz (reelected in 2010 and 2016) 
1986-2004: Alfred Stöckl
1972-1986: Johannes Strasser

References

Donau-Ries
Populated places on the Danube